The Mattagami River is a river in Northern Ontario, Canada.

The Mattagami flows  from its source at Mattagami Lake in geographic Gouin Township in the Unorganized North Part of Sudbury District, on the Canadian Shield southwest of Timmins, to Portage Island in geographic Gardiner Township in the Unorganized North Part of Cochrane District, in the Hudson Bay Lowlands. The Mattagami River flows through the city of Timmins as well as the town of Smooth Rock Falls and its drainage basin encompasses .

The Mattagami's name comes from the Ojibwe and means either "the start of water" (maadaagami) or "turbulent water" (madaagami), but the local Ojibwe population claim "Mattagami" is a corrupted form of "confluence" (maadawaagami). According to the Mattagami First Nation, Mattagami means "Meeting of the Waters".

Course

The river starts at Mattagami Lake and ends at its confluence with Missinaibi River, serving as a source for Moose River.

Economy
Where the Groundhog and Kapuskasing Rivers flow into the Mattagami, Ontario Power Generation operates the Little Long Generating Station, with a dam just over 5 km in length.

Tributaries
Tributaries include the:
Kapuskasing River
Nemegosenda River
Chapleau River
Groundhog River
Ivanhoe River
Nat River
Poplar Rapids River
Kamiskotia River
Grassy River
Tatachikapika River
Mattagami Lake
Minisinakwa River
Nabakwasi River
Opikinimika River
Noble River

See also
List of rivers of Ontario

References

External links 

 Mattagami Region Conservation Authority

Geography of Timmins
Rivers of Timiskaming District
Rivers of Sudbury District
Rivers of Cochrane District
Tributaries of Hudson Bay